Théo Bertholet (14 July 1896 – 15 May 1971) was a Swiss racing cyclist. He rode in the 1925 Tour de France.

References

1896 births
1971 deaths
Swiss male cyclists
Place of birth missing